"Rêve d'avoir des rêves" is a song by French hip hop artist Nekfeu, produced by himself and DJ Elite. It is the fifth track from his debut studio album Feu.

Although the song was not officially released as a single, the song managed to enter the French Singles Chart at number 111 on 20 June 2015, where it has since peaked.

Track listing
 Digital download
 "Rêve d'avoir des rêves" – 4:57

Chart performance

References

2015 songs
Nekfeu songs
French hip hop songs
Songs written by Nekfeu